Sarchinger Weiher is a lake in Landkreis Regensburg, Bavaria, Germany. At an elevation of 330 metres, its surface area is 0.28 square kilometers.

The lake is a flooded gravel-pit. In the surrounding area, there are several small lakes created by gravel quarrying.

On these banks, there are also kiosks, lavatories and official fireplaces for  barbecues. The further lakesides are planted with trees and shrubs to provide sufficient shade.

In the middle of the southern half of the lake, there is a small island which over the last years and decades became a breeding zone for rare birds, e.g. the black-crowned Night Heron. The island is still freely accessible.

Lakes of Bavaria